Anthony Campbell (born May 27, 1990) is an amateur boxer from the United States.

He was a silver medalist at the USA National Championships Boxing 2014.

At the 2015 Pan American Games, Campbell fought as a middleweight, but lost in the quarterfinals.

At the 2015 AIBA World Boxing Championships, Campbell fought as a middleweight, winning his first match and losing his second match.

References

External links
 
 

1990 births
Living people
American male boxers
Boxers at the 2015 Pan American Games
Middleweight boxers
Pan American Games competitors for the United States